Chandrakant Mokate is an Indian politician and member of the Shiv Sena. He was a member of the Maharashtra Legislative Assembly from the  Kothrud assembly constituency in Pune.

Positions held 
 2007: Elected to  Pune Municipal Corporation
 2007: Elected as Deputy Mayor of the  Pune Municipal Corporation.
 2009: Elected to Maharashtra Legislative Assembly.

References 

Maharashtra MLAs 2009–2014
Politicians from Pune
Living people
Shiv Sena politicians
Marathi politicians
Year of birth missing (living people)